Mount McLoughlin is a dormant steep-sided stratovolcano, or composite volcano, in the Cascade Range of southern Oregon and within the United States Sky Lakes Wilderness. It is one of the volcanic peaks in the Cascade Volcanic Arc, within the High Cascades sector. A prominent landmark for the Rogue River Valley, the mountain is north of Mount Shasta, and south-southeast of Crater Lake. It was named around 1838 after John McLoughlin, a Chief Factor for the Hudson's Bay Company. Mount McLouglin's prominence has made it a landmark to Native American populations for thousands of years.

McLoughlin consists largely of basaltic andesite. It underwent three major eruptive periods before its last activity took place between 30,000 and 20,000 years ago. It is not currently monitored for activity or deformation. Diverse species of flora and fauna inhabit the area, which is subject to frequent snowfall and temperature variation between seasons. The Pacific Crest Trail skirts the eastern and northern sides and also accesses the only trail to the summit, the  McLoughlin Trail 3716. The mountain can also be skied.

Geography 

Most of the volcano lies in Jackson County, though the eastern side of its base lies in Klamath County.

It can be seen from the Interstate 5 and U.S. Route 97 highways. From the southwest and southeast, it has a symmetrical appearance, but the northeastern flank of the volcano has been eroded and transformed into a hollow amphitheater.

Wilderness 

The wilderness area encompasses more than 200 bodies of water including ponds and lakes, in addition to forests and mountain ridges.

Physical geography 

The local area has warm, dry summers during the daytime with cool nights, and snowy winters that impede access to the Sky Lakes Wilderness through July. Moisture is limited between June and October barring occasional thunderstorms, which accounts for a very short growing season between ice thawing and drought. On average, precipitation does not exceed  at medium elevations, reaching  at greater heights, most of which consists of snowfall.

Around the base of the mountain, there are a number of lakes, including the Lake of the Woods and Fourmile Lake. The Upper Klamath Lake, the largest body of freshwater in the state, sits to the east of Mount McLoughlin. The Summit Lake is a small lake on the northern slope of the volcano between the Rogue River and the Klamath Basin. The Big Butte Creek, a tributary of the Rogue River, drains the northwestern part of McLoughlin, while the Little Butte Creek is fed by the southern flanks.

Ecology 
About 20 tree species can be found throughout Mount McLoughlin's surroundings, including Pacific yew at low elevations, mountain hemlock, whitebark pine, and subalpine fir at higher elevations, and lodgepole pine and red fir throughout. Other plant species include shrubs, wildflowers, junipers, heather, columbine, kinnikinnick, huckleberry, chinquapins, grouse huckleberry, and bearberry.

Common fauna in the area include chipmunks, deer, elk, American black bears, coyotes, while yellow-bellied marmots, fishers, pikas, and American martens are less common. More than 150 bird species live in the Big Butte Creek watershed near McLoughlin. Eagles and hawks can be sighted in the vicinity, as can spotted owls. goshawks like to live beneath the tree canopy in the region. Amphibian species like Oregon spotted frogs and Cascades frogs live in certain parts of the watershed. Fish species include Chinook salmon, rainbow trout, Coho salmon, Pacific lamprey, and coastal cutthroat trout.

Geology 

Little was known about Mount McLoughlin's geology until the 1970s. Much of what is known today comes from LeRoy Maynard of the Center for Volcanology at the University of Oregon. His work established that the volcano was built over three eruptive phases, each with their own eruption types. James Smith from the United States Geological Survey expanded on Maynard's findings, producing a map of the McLoughlin region.

McLoughlin is part of the High Cascades, which trend north–south. Formed towards the end of the Pleistocene Epoch, these mountains are underlain by more ancient volcanoes that subsided due to parallel north–south faulting in the surrounding region. Like other Cascade volcanoes, Mount McLoughlin was fed by magma chambers produced by the subduction of the Juan de Fuca tectonic plate under the western edge of the North American tectonic plate. At McLoughlin, mean displacement rates for the past 16 million years have been  each year.

The volcano shows magnetic high points to the east of its main cone, suggesting that it has normal magnetic polarization that corresponds to an age of less than 700,000 years. Other evidence that the volcano is geologically young include its symmetrical shape on the western and southern sides, its well-preserved lava flow deposits, and the absence of soil formation on many of its flow deposits.

McLoughlin is a stratovolcano, made up of basaltic andesite on top of underlying basaltic andesitic shield volcanoes. Much of its central volcanic cone formed within the last 200,000 years, including lava flows on the sides of the mountain that are between 30,000 and 20,000 years old.

During the last ice age, a large ice cap buried most of the High Cascades, reaching thicknesses in the thousands of feet. Pleistocene glaciers carved out McLoughlin's major volcanic cone, excavating two solidified lava tubes that reached the summit crater. A cirque glacier occupied part of the depression until early in the 20th century. The volcano displays a lack of snow during the summer season.

Nearby features 

Two nearby volcanoes closely resemble Mount McLoughlin in composition and structure.

Brown Mountain has been dated to between 60,000 and 12,000 years old. It produced basaltic andesite lava flows that have not been heavily eroded, but during Pleistocene glacial advance, ice streams on the volcano ate away at the cinder cone that formed Brown Mountain's summit. This formed a glacial cirque with a bowl shape on the northeastern flank.

Like Brown Mountain, Pelican Butte has a cinder cone on the top of its summit, in addition to a glacial cirque and ravine that were excavated on its northeastern side. These eroded areas exhibit pyroclastic rock in a matrix with lava flows, suggesting that blocky and ʻaʻā lavas formed an outer shell around Pelican Butte's fragmented interior. Glaciation has also lowered the overall volcano by tens of yards.

Other volcanoes can be found within the Sky Lakes Wilderness area, including lava flows and mud flows at Big Bunchgrass Butte and Imagination Peak, in addition to more recent eruptive activity at Goosenest Mountain in the northeastern sector.

Eruptive history 

Mount McLoughlin underwent at least three distinct eruptive phases. Early activity at Mount McLoughlin was explosive, and it yielded tephra and pyroclastic rock that built about a third of the overall volume. These eruptions also yielded lava flows, but they only occurred on the lower flanks. The northwestern flank has volcanic vents that produced lava flows responsible for inundating the Fourbit Creek valley  from the base of McLoughlin, which extend up to the Big Butte Springs. Other lava flows from earlier eruptions reach at least  from the base of the mountain, a number of which run along the Oregon Route 140 highway.

A second eruptive stage was characterized by large lava flows, which covered the inner pyroclastic core with basaltic andesite. These thin lava flows formed a shell around the loosely compacted pyroclastic interior. The third stage of development consisted of floods of blocky lava erupting from below the summit and more fluid lavas erupting from basal fissures, mostly confined to the south slope. North Squaw Tip and South Squaw Tip on McLoughlin's west flank now mark the site of the two major blocky flow vents. There are two smaller vents as well. The entire third stage is thought to have happened after the last Pleistocene glaciers in the area had melted, due to a general lack of weathering and fresh appearance of the solidified lava. The freshest lava flows at Mount McLoughlin occur on the southern and western flanks of the mountain, and they are thought to be between 30,000 and 20,000 years old.

Future activity 

Mount McLoughlin's main volcanic cone has not erupted during the Holocene, with the last production of lava flows taking place between 30,000 and 20,000 years ago. The volcano is not currently monitored for activity or deformation. The closest seismic monitoring stations lie  to the south near Mount Shasta and the Medicine Lake Volcano.

Human history 

McLouglin has served as a landmark to Native American populations for thousands of years. They utilized the area to hunt and gather berries. The Takelma people referred to it as "Mal-sr" or "Alwilamchaldis", one of their mythical heroes, and they considered it the home of Tasuune, or the "Acorn Woman", a being that helped their acorns grow every year. In the culture of the Shasta people, McLoughlin was known as "Makayax"; the Klamath people named the volcano "Walum" and "Kesh yainatat", meaning the home of the "dwarf old woman" that controlled the west wind. McLoughlin was called "Melaiksi" by the Modoc people. The Little Butte Creek which drains from McLoughlin was called "So-ytanak", translating as "corner" or "rock house", by the Upper Takelma people.

First detected by an American explorer Peter Skene Ogden in 1827, McLoughlin has a complex name-place history. Ogden called the volcano "Mt. Sastise" after the Shasta Native Americans that helped him reach the Rogue Valley, but this name was later exchanged with Mount Shasta in northern California, then called "Pit Mountain". To local residents, Mount McLoughlin's English name was Mount Pitt, though it came to be referred to by other names including Mt. John Quincy Adams, Mt. Clear View, Snowy Butte, and Mt. Madison, also appearing in maps as Mount Pitt, Mount Simpson, and Mount Jackson. Though the volcano was also known as Mount McLoughlin during the 1800s, it was officially renamed in 1905 by the Oregon Legislative Assembly after Dr. John McLoughlin, a factor for the Hudson's Bay Company noted for helping American settlers in the 1830s and 1840s. An important figure in the local fur trade, McLoughlin was also known as the "Father of Oregon". The change from Pitt to McLoughlin was later confirmed by the United States Board on Geographic Names in 1912.

The area around Mount McLoughlin was frequented by fur trappers and explorers, but they did not settle for long stays in the area. Settlers living near the surrounding Sky Lakes Wilderness trapped beavers and martens during the winter seasons, hunted, and grazed sheep in warmer months. Stuart Falls and Twin Ponds marked popular spots for picking huckleberries. Trails and fire lookouts were constructed for the Sky Lakes Wilderness area in the early 1900s, with the Pacific Crest Trail expanding into the region during the mid-1970s, superseding the pre-existing Oregon Skyline Trail.

Mount McLoughlin's first known ascent took place in 1858, when Joseph Burpee, William Wilkinson, Dr. Greer, Henry Klippel, John S. Love, and Robert Haines, from the city of Jacksonville, reached the summit from the northeast. The event was reported in a letter published by the Jacksonville Democratic Times on May 28, 1897. In 1896, members of the Mazama mountaineering club including Lottie Reed, Henry Pittock, and Leslie Scott ascended the mountain.

As of 1926, Mount McLoughlin's western flank acts as the municipal watershed for Medford, its melted snow feeding the Big Butte Springs near the city. The summer melting of snow forms a shape that is referred to locally as "the angel wings" or "the diving eagle", which local fishers consider a sign of peak fishing opportunities in the mountain's lakes.

Recreation 
Mount McLoughlin has a  hiking trail to its summit. The trail receives moderate to heavy use each year; the peak is easiest to reach from July through September, when the trailhead is accessible by vehicle and snow is minimal along the path. The last mile of the route travels over blocky lava and rubble, and the trail above the tree line is less clearly delineated. From the summit, Mount Shasta and Crater Lake can be seen.

During the winter, the climb requires snowshoes, crampons, and ice axes, and is far more challenging than the popular summertime route. The access road from Oregon SR-140 may also be closed due to snow, requiring a longer approach on snowshoes or cross country skis. The mountain can also be skied, which has become more popular in recent years.

See also
Volcanic Legacy Scenic Byway

Notes 

References

Sources

External links

 

Cascade Range
Cascade Volcanoes
Cinder cones of the United States
Locations in Native American mythology
Mountains of Jackson County, Oregon
Mountains of Oregon
Stratovolcanoes of the United States
Subduction volcanoes
Volcanoes of Oregon
Pleistocene stratovolcanoes